The 1991 Davis Cup World Group Qualifying Round was held from 20 to 22 September. They were the main play-offs of the 1991 Davis Cup. The winners of the playoffs advanced to the 1992 Davis Cup World Group, and the losers were relegated to their respective Zonal Regions I.

Teams
Bold indicates team had qualified for the 1992 Davis Cup World Group.

From World Group

 
 
 
 
 
 
 
 

 From Americas Group I

 
 

 From Asia/Oceania Group I

 
 

 From Europe/Africa Group I

Results summary
Date: 20–22 September

The eight losing teams in the World Group first round ties and eight winners of the Zonal Group I final round ties competed in the World Group Qualifying Round for spots in the 1992 World Group.

Qualifying results

Great Britain vs. Austria

Belgium vs. Israel

Brazil vs. India

Cuba vs. Canada

Italy vs. Denmark

Mexico vs. Netherlands

Switzerland vs. New Zealand

Philippines vs. Sweden

References

External links
Davis Cup Official Website

World Group Qualifying Round